James or Jim Craig may refer to:

Entertainment
 James Humbert Craig (1877–1944), Irish painter
 James Craig (actor) (1912–1985), American actor
 James Craig (General Hospital), fictional character on television, a.k.a. Jerry Jacks
 Jim Craig (One Life to Live), on television
 Jim Craig (The Man from Snowy River), fictional character in film

Politics

U.K.
James Henry Craig (1748–1812), British military officer and Canadian Governor
James Craig (MP for Carrickfergus) (1759–1833), British politician
James Craig (Newcastle) (1834–1902), British politician
James Craig (physician) (1861–1933), Irish professor of Medicine and an independent politician
James Craig, 1st Viscount Craigavon (1871–1940), first Prime Minister of Northern Ireland
James Craig, 2nd Viscount Craigavon (1906–1974), British politician, son of prime minister
James Craig (diplomat) (1924–2017), British ambassador, lecturer, writer
James Craig (County Antrim, 20th century) (1931–1974), Northern Ireland politician

Elsewhere
James Craig (Missouri soldier) (1818–1888), American politician and soldier
James Craig (Canadian politician) (1823–1874), farmer and politician in Ontario
James J. Craig (1853–1929), educator and politician in Ontario
James Craig (Australian politician) (1911–1989), Australian politician

Sports
James B. Craig (1893–1990), American football player and coach
Jim Craig (rugby league) (1895–1959), Australian rugby league footballer and coach
Jim Craig (Australian footballer) (1900–1978), Australian rules footballer
Jim Craig (Scottish footballer) (born 1943), fullback
Jim Craig (ice hockey) (born 1957), American hockey player 
James Craig (rugby union, born 1977), Scottish rugby player, son of footballer Jim Craig
James Craig (rugby union, born 1988), English rugby union player

Other
 James Craig (architect) (1739–1795), Scottish architect
 James Craig (loyalist) (1941–1988), Ulster loyalist paramilitary
 James Craig (police chief) (born 1956), 2022 Republican candidate for Governor of Michigan
 James Craig (VC) (1824–1861), British soldier
 James Ireland Craig (1868–1952), Scottish mathematician and meteorologist
 James Craig (barque), three-mast sailing ship
 , American destroyer escort launched in 1943, named for U.S. Navy officer James Edwin Craig
 James Thomson Gibson-Craig (1799–1886), Scottish book collector
 Sir James Gibson-Craig (1765–1850), 1st Baronet Gibson-Craig
 Sir James Henry Gibson-Craig (1841–1908), 3rd Baronet Gibson-Craig
 James Craig, an accessory to murder involving followers of Charles Manson
 James Craig, pen name of Roy J. Snell

See also
 Craig (surname)
Craig James (disambiguation)

Craig, James